Ma′unga Terevaka is the largest, tallest and youngest of three main extinct volcanoes that form Easter Island. Several smaller volcanic cones and craters dot its slopes, including a crater hosting one of the island's three lakes, Rano Aroi.

While Terevaka forms the bulk of Easter Island, the island has two older volcanic peaks: Poike which forms the eastern headland and Rano Kau the southern. Terevaka last erupted in the Pleistocene and is less than 400,000 years old. Its lava field at Roiho has been dated at between 110,000 and 150,000 years old. Terevaka can be climbed via a trail that starts next to the moai at Ahu Akivi.

Terevaka is the 12th most topographically isolated summit on Earth.

See also
 List of volcanoes in Chile
 List of islands by highest point
 Topographic isolation

References
 
 Kaneoka I, Katsui Y, 1985. K-Ar ages of volcanic rocks from Easter Island. Bull Volc Soc Japan, 30: 33–36.
 Vezzoli L, Acocella V, 2009. Easter Island, SE Pacific: an end-member type of hotspot volcanism. Geol Soc Amer Bull, 121: 869–886.

External links
 Education-Conservation-Research Terevaka Archaeological Outreach (non-profit)
 Guide to Easter Island from the Easter Island Foundation
 Old photos of Rano Aroi (upper right)

Extinct volcanoes
Pleistocene shield volcanoes
Volcanic crater lakes
Volcanoes of Easter Island